Basilissa is a genus of extremely small deep water sea snails. They are marine gastropod mollusks in the family Seguenziidae.

Species
Species within the genus Basilissa (gastropod) include:
 Basilissa soyoae Okutani, 1964
 Basilissa superba Watson, 1879

The following species were brought into synonymy:
 Basilissa alta Watson, 1879 synonym of Hadroconus altus (Watson, 1879)
 Basilissa babelica Watson, 1907 synonym of Orectospira tectiformis (Watson, 1880)
 Basilissa bombax Cotton & Godfrey, 1938 synonym of Calliobasis bombax (Cotton & Godfrey, 1938)
 Basilissa costulata Watson, 1879 synonym of Ancistrobasis reticulata (Philippi, 1844)
 Basilissa discula (Dall, 1889): synonym of Fluxinella discula (Dall, 1889)
 Basilissa gelida Barnard, 1963: synonym of Fluxinella gelida (Barnard, 1963) (original combination)
 Basilissa lampra Watson, 1879 synonym of Rotellenzia lampra (Watson, 1879)
 Basilissa munda Watson, 1879 synonym of Asthelys munda (Watson, 1879)
 Basilissa niceterium Hedley & May, 1908 synonym of Carinastele niceterium (Hedley & May, 1908)
 Basilissa rhyssa Dall, 1927: synonym of Basilissopsis rhyssa (Dall, 1927)
 Basilissa sibogae Schepman, 1908 synonym of Hadroconus sibogae (Schepman, 1908)
 Basilissa simplex Watson, 1879 synonym of Asthelys simplex (Watson, 1879)
 Basilissa trochiformis (Schepman, 1909) synonym of Fluxinella trochiformis (Schepman, 1909)
 Basilissa watsoni Dall, 1927 synonym of Hadroconus watsoni (Dall, 1927)

References

External links
 To ITIS
 To World Register of Marine Species

 
Seguenziidae
Monotypic gastropod genera